Penrith Brothers Rugby League Football Club is an Australian rugby league football club based in Penrith, New South Wales which was formed in 1968. It was initially known as St. Dominics RLFC but was rebranded as Penrith Brothers RLFC in 2003. On 22 March 2018, it was announced that Brothers Penrith would be fielding a team to compete in The Ron Massey Cup competition taking the place of The Auburn Warriors who became defunct. They also began fielding a team in The Sydney Shield competition for the 2018 season.

History
For the 2018 season, both of the Brothers Penrith teams in the Ron Massey Cup and Sydney Shield finished with the wooden spoon in their respective competitions with the Sydney Shield side winning only one game for the entire season.
At the end of the 2019 season, Brothers Penrith finished last in the Ron Massey Cup for a second consecutive season.  The Sydney Shield side avoided the wooden spoon finishing second last above the Belrose Eagles.
On 4 September 2022, Brothers Penrith reached the 2022 Sydney Shield grand final but were defeated 36-12 by St Mary's.

Notable players 
Greg Alexander
Mitchell Allgood
Mark Carroll
John Cartwright
Nathan Cleary
Garrett Crossman
Kurt Falls
Brad Fittler
Des Hasler
Clay Priest
Luke Rooney
Jesse Sene-Lefao
Steve Turner

Playing Record in NSWRL Competition

Fourth Tier

Third Tier

See also

List of rugby league clubs in Australia

References

External links
Brothers RLFC website

Rugby league teams in Sydney
Rugby clubs established in 1968
1968 establishments in Australia
Penrith, New South Wales